is a villanous professional wrestling stable, currently performing in the Japanese independent scene. Leaded by Risa Sera, the stable also consists of Suzu Suzuki, Akane Fujita, Mochi Natsumi and Hiragi Kurumi.

History

Formation and departure from Ice Ribbon (2021)

On December 1, 2021, it was announced that the current five members of the stable would be leaving Ice Ribbon after they could not agree on the establishment of a new sub-brand with a focus on hardcore matches in contract talks with the officials of the promotion. In a press conference held at short notice by Ice Ribbon on the same day, the five announced not only their exodus but also the founding of their group, under whose banner they also want to organize shows with a focus on death and hardcore wrestling in the future. Despite her contract with Ice Ribbon expiring and after announcing her departure from the company, Akane Fujita defeated Rina Yamashita on December 31, 2021, in a falls count anywhere match at New Ice Ribbon #1168 ~ Ribbonmania 2021 to win the FantastICE Championship, title which she held until even after her departure. Risa Sera also held the International Ribbon Tag Team Championship alongside her long time tag partner of Azure Revolution, Maya Yukihi from August 9 until December 31, when they dropped the titles to Hamuko Hoshi and Ibuki Hoshi at Ribbonmania 2021.

Independent circuit (2022–present)
The stable participated in their first independent show on January 4, 2022, at Gake No Fuchi vs. Prominence, where Fujita, Miyagi, Sera and Suzuki teamed up with DDT Pro Wrestling's Sanshiro Takagi to defeat Chris Brookes, Miyako Matsumoto, Mao and Shunma Katsumata. Suzu Suzuki competed in Pro Wrestling Wave's 2022 edition of the Catch the Wave tournament, fighting in the Future Block against Rina Kawahata, Kitsune, Haruka Umesaki and Chie Ozora. Suzuki eventually succeeded in defeating Miyuki Takase in the finals of the tournament, match which was also for the vacant Wave Single Championship.

World Wonder Ring Stardom (2022–present)

The unit members debuted in World Wonder Ring Stardom on January 29, 2022, at Stardom Nagoya Supreme Fight where they began feuding with Donna Del Mondo's leader Giulia in a feud based on the real-life situation of Giulia's sudden and controversial departure from Ice Ribbon in late 2019. The feud eventually extended to other members of Donna Del Mondo, and on the first night of the Stardom World Climax 2022 on March 26, Sera and Suzuki picked up a victory over Maika and Thekla (Thekla also had history with all Prominence members due to her time in Ice Ribbon). On the second night of the event on March 27, Sera, Suzuki, Fujita & Mochi fell short to Giulia, Himeka, Maika and Thekla in an Eight-woman tag team match. At Stardom New Blood 2 on May 13, 2022, Suzu Suzuki defeated Mai Sakurai and after the match once again verbally sparred with Giulia and also accepted a challenge on behalf of Prominence from the Stardom unit, Cosmic Angels. At Stardom Flashing Champions on May 28, 2022, Suzu Suzuki, Akane Fujita and Mochi Natsumi defeated Unagi Sayaka, Mina Shirakawa and Waka Tsukiyama. In the main event of the pay-per-view, Risa Sera unsuccessfully challenged Syuri for the World of Stardom Championship, concluding a short-term feud between Prominence and God's Eye (the faction Syuri began after leaving DDM). In May, Sera and Suzuki were announced to compete in the Stardom 5 Star Grand Prix 2022 tournament beginning later in the year. At Stardom New Blood 3 on July 8, 2022, Suzu Suzuki went into a time-limit draw against Mirai. During the event, Suzuki and Sera showed that their feud with Donna Del Mondo was not over, as they challenged Giulia and Mai Sakurai for a tag team match on further notice. Hiragi Kurumi also attacked Syuri backstage, hinting that even the war against God's Eye was not over yet. At Stardom in Showcase vol.1 on July 23, 2022, Suzu Suzuki and Risa Sera defeated Giulia and Mai Sakurai in a hardcore tag team match and Hiragi Kurumi fell short to Syuri in an "I quit" match. At Mid Summer Champions in Tokyo, the second event of the Stardom Mid Summer Champions which took place on July 24, 2022, Risa Sera, Hiragi Kurumi and Suzu Suzuki defeated Cosmic Angels (Mina Shirakawa, Unagi Sayaka and Hikari Shimizu) and Queen's Quest (Lady C, Hina and Miyu Amasaki) in a three-way tag team match. At Stardom in Showcase vol.2 on September 25, 2022, Suzu Suzuki defeated Starlight Kid in one of her GP matches. Sera finished the 2022 5 Star Grand Prix with a total of 15 points, same as Suzuki. The latter scored a draw against Giulia on the finals day from October 1, concluding her feud with the Donna Del Mondo leader. At Stardom New Blood 5 on October 19, 2022, Suzu Suzuki teamed up with Ancham to defeat Queen's Quest's Lady C and Hina. At Stardom in Showcase vol.3 on November 26, 2022, Suzu Suzuki, Risa Sera and Hiragi Kurumi defeated Cosmic Angels' Tam Nakano, Natsupoi and Unagi Sayaka. At Stardom Dream Queendom 2 on December 29, 2022, Sera, Suzuki and Kurumi defeated Oedo Tai's Starlight Kid, Momo Watanabe and Saki Kashima to win the Artist of Stardom Championship.

At Stardom Supreme Fight 2023 on February 4, 2023, Suzu Suzuki unsuccessfully challenged Giulia for the World of Stardom Championship.

Members

Current

Sub-groups

Former

Timeline

Championships and accomplishments
*Noted underneath are the accomplishments of the unit's members being recognized since December 1, 2021.
Ice Ribbon
FantastICE Championship (1 time, current) – Fujita
International Ribbon Tag Team Championship (1 time) – Risa Sera with Maya Yukihi
Pro Wrestling Illustrated
 Ranked Suzuki No. 41 of the top 150 female singles wrestlers in the PWI Women's 150 in 2022
 Ranked Sera No. 59 of the top 150 female singles wrestlers in the PWI Women's 150 in 2022
Pro Wrestling Wave
Wave Single Championship (1 time) – Suzuki
Catch the Wave (2022) – Suzuki
World Wonder Ring Stardom
Artist of Stardom Championship (1 time, current) – Suzuki, Sera and Kurumi
Triangle Derby (2023) – Suzuki, Sera and Kurumi
 5★Star GP Award
 5★Star GP Best Match Award 
 (2022) –

Notes

See also
Neo Stardom Army
Donna Del Mondo
Cosmic Angels
God's Eye
Queen's Quest
Oedo Tai
Stars

References

External links 

 

Independent promotions teams and stables
Japanese promotions teams and stables
Women's wrestling teams and stables
World Wonder Ring Stardom teams and stables